Caldicott, also known as Vessey House and Essex Farm, is a historic home located at Rehobeth, Somerset County, Maryland, United States. It is a large frame dwelling constructed between 1784 and 1798 by Littleton Dennis Jr. The house stands two stories above a raised basement of Flemish bond brick.  Also on the property are a gambrel-roofed barn, sheds and storage buildings, and a water tower.

Caldicott was listed on the National Register of Historic Places in 1983.

References

External links
, including photo from 1987, at Maryland Historical Trust
 Caldicott One-Name Study

Houses in Somerset County, Maryland
Houses on the National Register of Historic Places in Maryland
Federal architecture in Maryland
Houses completed in 1784
National Register of Historic Places in Somerset County, Maryland